The  Arizona Cardinals season was the franchise's 97th season, 76th season in the National Football League (NFL), the eighth in Arizona and the second as the Arizona Cardinals. Former Seattle Seahawks quarterback Dave Krieg started in his only season with the team. The Cardinals failed to improve upon their 8–8 record from 1994 and finished 4–12, resulting in the firing of head coach Buddy Ryan and his entire staff.

Offseason

NFL Draft

Personnel

Staff

Roster

Regular season

Schedule

Standings

Awards and records 
 Larry Centers, Franchise Record (since broken), Most Receptions in One Season, 101 
 Greg Davis, Franchise Record, Most Field Goals in One Season, 30 
 Garrison Hearst, NFL Comeback Player of the Year

Milestones 
 Larry Centers, 1st 100 Reception Season

Pop culture 
The season was featured in the 1996 film Jerry Maguire. Portions of the film centered on fictional wide receiver Rod Tidwell, played by Cuba Gooding Jr., and his agent Jerry Maguire, played by Tom Cruise.

References

External links 
 1995 Arizona Cardinals at Pro-Football-Reference.com

Arizona
Arizona Cardinals seasons
Arizona